Chenar (also Romanized as Chenār) is a village in Tirchai Rural District, Kandovan District, Meyaneh County, East Azerbaijan Province, Iran. At the 2006 census, its population was 61, in 19 families.

References 

Populated places in Meyaneh County